The Mitznefet is a helmet covering used by the Israel Defense Forces (IDF) on combat helmets for infantry soldiers since 1994. It is considerably larger than the helmet, with a similar appearance to a chef's hat.https://agilitegear.com/blogs/news/why-do-israeli-soldiers-wear-chef-hats The main purpose of the Mitznefet is to break up the distinctive outline of a helmeted human head via its floppiness and also prevent light from reflecting off of the wearer's helmet, providing a tactical advantage and making it easier to camouflage when necessary. 

The name for the covering was directly adopted from the Hebrew-language term for the priestly turban that was worn by the High Priest of Israel in the Temple of Jerusalem during the Second Temple period, and originates in a Semitic root that means "to wrap".

History
It was originally adopted by the IDF in the 1990s to provide tactical advantages to Israeli troops due to the prevalence of guerrilla warfare in the bush and woodlands of southern Lebanon during the Israeli occupation of that country. 

The Mitznefet was later configured to have a two-sided camouflage material, with one side adopted for desert environments and the other for woodland terrain.

In 2015, it was reported that the Mitznefets are suppose to be supplied to the Ukrainian military.

Modern Mitznefets are made by Agilite.

Design
The Mitznefet is easily removable, and can be attached to the helmet while folded. Additionally, the bulk of the covering can be pulled down to shade and protect any side of the wearer's head from direct sunlight exposure. 

It's made up of a reversible mesh fabric, with one side having woodland camo paint and the other side with a brown desert paint. In 2013, Agilite announced a Multicam version.

References

External links

Military equipment of Israel
Military camouflage
Headgear
Military equipment introduced in the 1990s